SK Pardubice was a Czech football club from the city of Pardubice, which played in the Czechoslovak First League between 1937 and 1946. It was founded in 1905 and dissolved in 1960. The club's greatest success was finishing third in the 1938–39 Czechoslovak First League, an achievement repeated in the subsequent two seasons.

Historical names 
 1905 – SK Pardubice
 1948 – Sokol MZK Pardubice
 1949 – ČSSZ Pardubice
 1953 – Tatran Pardubice

References

External links

Football clubs in Czechoslovakia
Defunct football clubs in the Czech Republic
Czechoslovak First League clubs
Association football clubs established in 1905
1905 establishments in Austria-Hungary
Association football clubs disestablished in 1960
Sport in Pardubice
1960 disestablishments in Czechoslovakia